Homona privigena is a species of moth of the family Tortricidae first described by Józef Razowski in 2013. It is found on Seram Island in Indonesia. The habitat consists of upper montane forests.

The wingspan is about 27 mm for males and 33 mm for females. The ground colour of the forewings is brownish cream with brownish strigulation (fine streaks) and brown markings. The hindwings are yellowish cream, but becoming darker apically.

Etymology
The species name refers to close affinity of this species to Homona coffearia and is derived from Latin privigena (meaning a stepdaughter).

References

Moths described in 2013
Homona (moth)